Boomsma is a Dutch surname. Notable people with the surname include:

 Arie Boomsma (born 1974), Dutch television presenter
 Clifford David Boomsma (1915-2004), Australian botanist
 Dorret Boomsma (born 1957), Dutch biological psychologist
 Jacobus Boomsma (born 1951), Danish-Dutch evolutionary biologist
 Rein Boomsma (1879-1943), Dutch footballer

Dutch-language surnames